Noel Emmanuel Luke (born 28 December 1964) is an English former footballer who played as a right back and winger in the Football League during the 1980s and 1990s, most notably with Peterborough United.

Career
Luke was born in Birmingham, and started his career with West Bromwich Albion, whose youth academy he joined aged 14. He made his West Brom debut aged 17, but only managed 9 League appearances for them. He left the club in 1984 to join Mansfield Town after West Brom disbanded their reserve team and after 50 League games with them he moved in 1986 to Peterborough United. He was to go on to play 277 League games for the Posh, and he scored for them in Mark Lawrenson's managerial debut for Peterborough. His last game for the club was on 20 March 1993 against Oxford United. He was on a week-to-week contract prior to the termination of his contract, and was released in March 1993 by manager Lil Fuccillo to make space in his squad for new signing Chris Greenman.

After leaving Peterborough he had a short spell at Rochdale, making his last Football League appearance on 10 April 1993 as a substitute against Scunthorpe United. He then moved into non-league football with Boston United. He later had spells with Holbeach United, Corby Town, King's Lynn and Raunds Town.

After football
After retiring from football, Luke operated the in-stadium "pub" at Peterborough United's ground and also worked in matchday hospitality at the club. More recently, he has worked as a HGV driver for Tesco.

References

1964 births
Living people
English footballers
Footballers from Birmingham, West Midlands
Association football midfielders
West Bromwich Albion F.C. players
Mansfield Town F.C. players
Peterborough United F.C. players
Rochdale A.F.C. players
Boston United F.C. players
Holbeach United F.C. players
Corby Town F.C. players
King's Lynn F.C. players
Raunds Town F.C. players
English Football League players